Evan J. Vickers is an American politician and a Republican member of the Utah State Senate representing District 28 since January 1, 2013. Vickers previously served in the Utah State Legislature from January 1, 2009 until December 31, 2012 in the Utah House of Representatives District 72 seat.

Personal life, education, and career
Vickers earned his BS in pharmacy from the University of Utah. He is a pharmacist by profession and has won the Pharmacist of the Year award from the Utah Pharmacist Association. Vickers has also been associated with the Utah Pharmacists Association (on the Board of Directors), American Associated Pharmacies (on the Board of Directors), Iron Mission Foundation Board, and Valley View Medical Center Board of Directors.

Vickers has been married to his wife, Chris for 36 years and they have 5 children together.

Political career
Vickers started his political career by serving on the Cedar City Council from 1987 to 1999. He then served in the House of Representatives from 2009 to 2012. He was elected to his Senate seat in 2012. Throughout his time in the Legislature, Vickers has been awarded the Legislator of the Year for the Utah Pharmacist Association, the NFIB Utah Small Business Champion of the Year, and the Man of the Year.

In 2016, Vickers served on the following committees: 
Business, Economic Development, and Labor Appropriations Subcommittee
Higher Education Appropriations Subcommittee
Senate Health and Human Services Committee (Chair)
Senate Natural Resources, Agriculture, and Environment Committee

Elections
Vickers ran for reelection in 2014 unopposed in the general election and won. He had one challenger in the primary that he beat.

2012 
Vickers challenged appointed Republican Senator Casey O. Anderson in the special election June 26, 2012, Republican Primary, winning with 6,549 votes (66%) and won the November 6, 2012, general election with 28,073 votes (82.6%) against Democratic nominee Geoffrey Chestnut.

2010 
Vickers was unopposed for the June 22, 2010, Republican Primary and won the November 2, 2010 general election with 7,356 votes (83.5%) against Libertarian candidate Barry Short.

In 2008 Vickers challenged House District 72 incumbent Republican Representative DeMar Bowman and was selected by the Republican convention for the three-way November 4, 2008 general election, winning with 10,238 votes (74.8%) against Democratic nominee Lawrence Daniel (who had run for the seat in 2006).

Legislation

2016 sponsored bills

References

External links
Official page at the Utah State Legislature
Campaign site
Evan Vickers at Ballotpedia
Evan J. Vickers at the National Institute on Money in State Politics

1954 births
21st-century American politicians
Living people
Republican Party members of the Utah House of Representatives
People from Cedar City, Utah
People from Panguitch, Utah
University of Utah alumni
Utah city council members
Republican Party Utah state senators